The heaviest artificial objects to reach space include space stations, various upper stages, and discarded Space Shuttle external tanks. Spacecraft may change mass over time such as by use of propellant. 

Currently the heaviest spacecraft is the International Space Station, nearly double Shuttle-Mir's mass in orbit. It began assembly with a first launch in 1998, however it only attained its full weight in the 2020s, due to its modular nature and gradual additions. Its mass can change significantly depending on what modules are added or removed.

Selected spacecraft (by mass)
All numbers listed below for satellites use their mass at launch, if not otherwise stated.

See also
List of large reentering space debris
Lists of spacecraft

References

Lists of spacecraft
Heaviest or most massive things